Copiague is a hamlet on Long Island (and census-designated place) in Suffolk County, New York, United States. The population was 23,429 at the 2020 census. Copiague is an unincorporated place within Babylon.

Geography 
Copiague is located at  (40.674700, -73.393235).

Copiague is bordered by Amityville to the west, North Amityville to the north, Lindenhurst to the east, and the Great South Bay to the south.

South of Montauk Highway, Copiague is divided into three major peninsulas:

 The southwestern peninsula is known as Amity Harbor and is served by the Amityville Post Office.
 The central peninsula is known as Copiague Harbor and is served by the Copiague Post Office.
 The southeastern peninsula is known as American Venice and is served by the Lindenhurst Post Office.

Demographics 

As of the census of 2010, there were 23,429 people and 6,942 households, with 3.33 persons per household. The population density was 7,144.3 per square mile (2,770.2/km2).

There were 7,919 housing units, of which 82.0% were owner-occupied. 4.8% of housing units were vacant and 28.0% of occupied housing units were occupied by renters.

The racial makeup of the CDP was 83.5% White, 7.6% African American, 0.3% Native American, 2.2% Asian, 0.0% Pacific Islander, 13.0% some other race, and 3.5% from two or more races. Hispanic or Latino of any race were 32.7% of the population. The CDP was 57.3% non-Hispanic White.

There were 7,535 households, out of which 29.2% had children under the age of 18 living with them, 49.2% were headed by married couples living together, 14.9% had a female householder with no husband present, and 28.4% were non-families. 21.4% of all households were made up of individuals, and 8.9% were someone living alone who was 65 years of age or older. The average household size was 3.04 and the average family size was 3.44.

In the CDP, the population was spread out, with 21.2% under the age of 18, 9.2% from 18 to 24, 29.6% from 25 to 44, 28.1% from 45 to 64, and 11.7% who were 65 years of age or older. The median age was 38.4 years.

For the period 2009–2011, it was estimated that 94.9% of the population had lived in the same house 1 year and over. 29.2% of the population were foreign-born, and 34.8% of residents at least 5 years old spoke a language other than English at home.

Between 2009 and 2011, 84.9% of residents at least 25 years old had graduated from high school, and 20.9% of residents at least 25 years old had a bachelor's degree or higher. The mean travel time to work for workers aged 16 and over was 25.1 minutes.

For the period 2009–2011, the median annual income for a household in the CDP was $74,065. The per capita income for the CDP was $29,768. 7.8% of the population were below the poverty line.

Education 
Most of Copiague is served by the Copiague Union Free School District, which also serves most of North Amityville, a small portion of North Lindenhurst, and a very small portion of East Farmingdale. However, a portion of Copiague, west of Bayview Avenue and north of Dixon Avenue, is in the Amityville Union Free School District.

As of the 2010–2011 school year, the Copiague Union Free School District had 4,720 students.

The district operates six schools:

Four elementary schools (Grades K–5):
Deauville Gardens East, Deauville Gardens West, Great Neck Road, and Susan E. Wiley

One middle school (Grades 6–8): Copiague Middle School
One high school (Grades 9–12): Walter G. O'Connell Copiague High School

Emergency Services 
Founded in 1928, the Copiague Volunteer Fire Department is the sole provider of fire and rescue services for the hamlet of Copiague. Three fire companies and two emergency squads are dispatched by the Town of Babylon Central Fire Alarm dispatch center out of two fire stations and the Tanner Park Marina. The north station, located on Dixon Ave. houses the Vigilant Engine Company and the Yellowbirds firematic drill team. The south station on Great Neck Rd. houses the Eagle Engine Company, the Hook, Ladder and Rescue Company, the Emergency Medical Services squad, and the Special Operations and Rescue squad. 

The department operates four engines, two utility vehicles assigned to each engine company, a 90 foot tower ladder, a heavy rescue truck, three ambulances, an ALS first response vehicle. The Special Operations and Rescue squad operates a fully enclosed and climate controlled 5-ton high water rescue vehicle, three boats ranging from a 19 foot Boston Whaler to a small inflatable, a Special Ops rescue van, a Yamaha side by side, and a double decker boat trailer.

Notable people 

Jerry Schatz, child actor
Chris Chetti, professional wrestler
Kene Holliday, actor
Donnie McClurkin, gospel singer and minister
Mike James, NBA player
John Tartamella, union organizer

References 

Babylon (town), New York
Census-designated places in New York (state)
Hamlets in New York (state)
Census-designated places in Suffolk County, New York
Hamlets in Suffolk County, New York
Populated coastal places in New York (state)